Phạm Ngạn (范彥, ?–?) was a general of Tây Sơn dynasty, Vietnam. 

Phạm Ngạn was a brother of Phạm Văn Tham and Phạm Công Hưng. He also had a sister Phạm Thị Liên, whom was Nguyễn Huệ's wife. 

He was promoted to Hộ Giá ("Protectorate General") by Nguyễn Nhạc. In late 1777, the main part of the Tây Sơn army left Saigon to go north and attack the Trịnh lords. Nguyễn Ánh, the new crowned Nguyễn lord, defeated Tây Sơn army, reoccupied Saigon. Ngạn led a navy to attack Biên Hòa, Saigon and adjacent coastal areas. He was defeated by Nguyễn lord, and had to flee. Later, he was killed by Hòa Nghĩa Quân ("Harmony Army"), an army led by Lý Tài whom a Chinese merchant.

In 1781, Đỗ Thanh Nhơn, an important general of Nguyễn lord, was executed by Nguyễn Ánh, which badly weakening the Nguyễn army. Getting the information, Nguyễn Nhạc and Nguyễn Huệ marched south to attack Nguyễn lord. Ngạn's death made Nguyễn Nhạc very angry. After the recapture of Saigon, Nhạc slaughtered all the Chinese in Chợ Lớn, and threw their bodies into the river.

References

Year of birth missing
Year of death missing
Tây Sơn dynasty generals
Vietnamese generals